Not Two, Not One is an album by the Canadian jazz pianist Paul Bley, with American bassist Gary Peacock and drummer Paul Motian, recorded in 1998 and released on the ECM label.

Reception
The AllMusic review by Steve Loewy stated: "None of the pieces drift, as these three masters contribute a mature perspective that comes from varied experience. Remarkable interplay, chamber-free harmonies, and loose improvisations add up to some special sounds".

Track listing 
All compositions by Paul Bley except as indicated
 "Not Zero: In Three Parts" (Gary Peacock, Paul Bley, Paul Motian) - 9:34   
 "Entelechy" (Peacock) - 2:08   
 "Now" - 4:35   
 "Fig Foot" - 5:38   
 "Vocal Tracked" - 5:24   
 "Intente" (Peacock) - 5:41   
 "Noosphere" (Peacock, Bley) - 7:07   
 "Set Up Set" (Peacock) - 6:19   
 "Dialogue Amour" (Peacock, Bley) - 8:07   
 "Don't You Know" (Peacock, Bley) - 6:57   
 "Not Zero: In One Part" (Peacock, Bley, Motian) - 0:55  
Recorded at Avatar Studio in New York City in January 1998

Personnel 
 Paul Bley — piano 
 Gary Peacock — bass
 Paul Motian — drums

References 

ECM Records albums
Paul Bley albums
Gary Peacock albums
1999 albums
Albums produced by Manfred Eicher